Unnatural is the ninth extended play by South Korean-Chinese girl group WJSN. It was released on March 31, 2021, by Starship Entertainment and distributed by Kakao Entertainment. It contains a total of six songs, including the lead single "Unnatural".

Members Cheng Xiao, Meiqi and Xuanyi were not a part of the album release due to scheduling conflicts in China.

Background
On March 8, WJSN announced that they would make their comeback in late March. It was later announced that they would return with their ninth mini album Unnatural on March 31.

Track listing

Awards and nominations

Music program wins

Charts

Release history

References 

2021 EPs
Cosmic Girls EPs
Korean-language EPs
Starship Entertainment EPs